WSKI (1240 AM, "Rock 93.3 & 103.3") is a radio station licensed to serve Montpelier, Vermont, United States. It is owned by Galloway Communications, Inc., a subsidiary of Bedford, New Hampshire-based Northeast Broadcasting. It airs a mainstream rock format and is simulcasting WWMP 103.3 FM Waterbury.

The station was assigned the WSKI call letters by the Federal Communications Commission.

Previous sports programming
While it previously aired the sports radio format and most of its programming from CBS Sports Radio, WSKI also aired local sports play-by-play, including being the official radio home for the Vermont Mountaineers of the NECBL.

Late night programming included Speed Freaks, The Video Game Review, and Sports Overnight America.

WSKI's longest continual running program is The Classic Country Jamboree, which has aired every Saturday since 1996. The show is hosted by former WSKI radio host Dick Sicely who was with the station from the 1960s to the 1980s. The station has had a number of announcers still found in area markets. The longest serving announcer, the late Bob Bannon, was with the station from the late 1940s and into the 1990s.

History
WSKI began broadcasting on December 7, 1947, on 1240 kHz with 250 watts of power. The station was owned by Carl R. Taylor and B.M. Jacobsen.

On April 22, 2020, WSKI changed their format from sports to a simulcast of mainstream rock-formatted WWMP 103.3 FM Waterbury.

Previous logo
  (WSKI's logo under former ESPN Radio affiliation)

References

External links
WSKI sports director's blog
FCC History Cards for WSKI

SKI
Radio stations established in 1947
1947 establishments in Vermont
Mainstream rock radio stations in the United States